La Cucaracha is a 1934 American short musical film directed by Lloyd Corrigan. The film was designed by Robert Edmond Jones, who was hired by Pioneer Pictures to design the film in a way to show the new full-color Technicolor Process No. 4 ("three-strip" Technicolor) at its best. Process No. 4 had been used since 1932, mainly in Walt Disney cartoons. Jock Whitney and his cousin C. V. Whitney, the owners of Pioneer, were also major investors in Technicolor. La Cucaracha was made like a short feature and cost about $65,000. The usual short film at that time cost little more than $15,000 to film.

Although La Cucaracha is sometimes called the first live-action use of Process No. 4, it was preceded by a musical number in the feature film The Cat and the Fiddle, released by MGM in February 1934, and in some short sequences filmed for other movies made during 1934, including the final sequences of The House of Rothschild (Twentieth Century Pictures/United Artists) with George Arliss. Also, Warner Brothers released a Leon Errol short, Service With a Smile (released July 28, 1934), just before La Cucaracha.

Producer Kenneth Macgowan won an Oscar in 1935 for Best Short Subject (Comedy) for this film.

Plot
Señor Martinez, a famous theater owner, visits a local café in Mexico because of its reputation for good food and to audition the famous dancer who performs there. Martinez tells the café owner that if the dancer is as good as he has heard, he will offer the dancer a contract to perform in his theater. The café's female singer hears about this and is determined that he won't leave the café without her.

Cast
 Steffi Duna as Chatita
 Don Alvarado as Pancho
 Paul Porcasi as Señor Esteban Martinez
 Eduardo Durant as Orchestra Leader
 Sam Appel as Cafe manager 
 Chris-Pin Martin as Chiquita's Fan in Cafe 
 Julian Rivero as Esteban
 Charles Stevens as Pancho's Valet

DVD release
On January 25, 2000, The Roan Group released La Cucaracha on Region 1 DVD as an extra with the restored 1930 feature Dixiana. On October 27, 2009, Alpha Video released La Cucaracha on Region 0 DVD.

References

External links

 
 
 
 
 

1934 films
1934 musical comedy films
1934 short films
American musical comedy films
1930s English-language films
Films directed by Lloyd Corrigan
Films set in Mexico
Live Action Short Film Academy Award winners
RKO Pictures short films
Early color films
1930s American films